Edsel Warren Gustafson (April 4, 1922 – November 18, 2012) was an American football player. He was president of the Vita Plus Corporation from 1976–1986.

Gustafson was born in Moline, Illinois.  He was inducted into George Washington University Hall of Fame in 1992.

References

External links

1922 births
2012 deaths
People from Moline, Illinois
Players of American football from Illinois
American football centers
American football linebackers
George Washington Colonials football players
Brooklyn Dodgers (AAFC) players

20th-century American businesspeople